John Martin may refer to:

Business
John Martin (businessman) (1820–1905), American lumberman and flour miller
John Charles Martin (fl. 1913–1931), American newspaper publisher
John Martin (publisher) (born 1930), American founder of Black Sparrow Press
John C. Martin (businessman) (1951–2021), CEO of biotechnology company Gilead Sciences

Entertainment
John Martin (actor) (born 1951), American actor
John Martin (painter) (1789–1854), English painter
John Blennerhassett Martin (1797–1857), American painter, engraver, and lithographer
John Martin (bibliographer) (1791–1855), English bookseller, librarian, and writer
John Martin (dance critic) (1893–1985), at The New York Times
John Scott Martin (1926–2009), English actor
John Martin (Canadian broadcaster) (1947–2006)
John Martin (comedian) (born 1962), British
John Martin (singer) (born 1980), Swedish
John Martin (born 1946), also known as "The Big Figure", English drummer and member of Dr. Feelgood (1971-1982)
John Martin, American film actor, in Browned Off (1944) and Mesa of Lost Women (1951)
John Martin, Norwegian musician, husband and manager of pianist Natalia Strelchenko

Law
John Martin (judge) (1784–1840), American judge of the Cherokee Tribal Court
John C. Martin (judge) (born 1943), North Carolina state court judge
John Donelson Martin Sr. (1883–1962), U.S. federal judge
John E. Martin (1891–1968), Wisconsin state court judge
John S. Martin Jr. (born 1935), U.S. federal judge

Military
John Donelson Martin (1830–1862), Confederate States Army officer during the American Civil War
John Martin (Royal Navy officer) (1918–2011), British admiral
John Martin (New Zealand admiral), Chief of the Royal New Zealand Navy
John L. Martin Jr. (1920–2009) US Air Force general

Politics

United Kingdom
John Martin (MP for Berwick-upon-Tweed), British Member of Parliament for Berwick-upon-Tweed, 1529
John Martin (died 1545), British Member of Parliament for Plympton Erle, 1529
John Martin (died c. 1592), British Member of Parliament for Plympton Erle, 1554
John Martin (1692–1767), British Member of Parliament for Tewkesbury, 1741–1747
John Martin (1724–1794), British Member of Parliament for Tewkesbury, 1754–1761

John Martin (1805–1880), British banker and Member of Parliament for Tewkesbury, 1832–1835
John Martin (Young Irelander) (1812–1875), Young Irelander and Member of Parliament for Meath, 1871–1875

John Hanbury Martin (1890–1983), British Member of Parliament for Southwark Central, 1940–1948
John Martin (civil servant) (1904–1991), Winston Churchill's private secretary
John Martin (Leicester MP), British Member of Parliament for Leicester, 1354
John Martin, Bailiff of Guernsey, 1499–1510
John Martin (1774–1832), British Member of Parliament for Tewkesbury, 1812–1832
John Martin (Irish politician), Irish Member of Parliament for the Irish constituency of Sligo Borough, 1832–1837

United States
John Martin (Governor of Georgia) (died 1786)
John Martin (Governor of Kansas) (1839–1889)
John Martin (Kansas) (1833–1913), U.S. Senator from Kansas
John Andrew Martin (1868–1939), U.S. Representative from Colorado
John C. Martin (politician) (1880–1952), U.S. Representative from Illinois
John F. Martin Jr., American Ambassador to Costa Rica (1920–1921)
John L. Martin (born 1941), American politician from Maine
John Marshall Martin (1832–1921), Confederate politician
John Mason Martin (1837–1898), U.S. Representative from Alabama
John Preston Martin (1811–1862), U.S. Representative from Kentucky
John W. Martin (1884–1958), governor of Florida
John Martin (pioneer) (1827-1893), early pioneer of Monterey County, California

Other countries
John Wills Martin (c. 1790–after 1843), English-born merchant and political figure in Newfoundland
John Martin (New Zealand politician) (1822–1892), member of the New Zealand Legislative Council
John S. Martin (politician) (1855–1946), politician in Prince Edward Island, Canada
John Strickler Martin (1875–1931), farmer and politician in Ontario, Canada
John Martin (Australian politician) (1890–1964), New South Wales politician
John Martin (British Columbia politician), MLA of a provincial legislature since 2013

Sports

Baseball
John Martin (baseball) (born 1956), American baseball pitcher
J. D. Martin (John Dale Martin, born 1983), Major League Baseball pitcher 
Pepper Martin (Johnny 1904–1965), American baseball player

Cricket
John Martin (cricketer, born 1867) (1867–1942), played for MCC and Devon
John Martin (cricketer, born 1941), played for Oxford University, Somerset, Oxfordshire, and Devon
John Martin (cricketer, born 1942), played for New South Wales
Johnny Martin (cricketer) (John Wesley 1931–1992), Australian cricketer

Football
John Martin (American football) (1895–?), American football player and coach
Johnny Martin (American football) (1916–1968), American football player
Alan Martin (footballer, born 1923) (John Alan 1923–2004), English footballer
Johnny Martin (footballer) (1946–2013), English former footballer
John Martin (goalkeeper) (born 1958), Scottish goalkeeper for Airdrieonians
John Martin (Irish footballer) (born 1979), midfielder
John Martin (English footballer) (born 1981)
John Martin (footballer, born 1985) (born 1985), Scottish footballer
John Martin (referee) (fl. 1978–1988), English association football referee

Other sports
John Martin (American racing driver) (1939–2019), Indy 500 driver
John Martin (Australian racing driver) (born 1984), Superleague Formula and British F3
John Martin (figure skater), 1989–1994
John Martin (Paralympian) (born 1943), Australian
John Martin (sport shooter) (1868–1951)
John A Martin (born 1948), English rugby league player
John David Martin (born 1939), American track and field athlete

Other
John Martin (Jamestown) (c. 1560–1632), settler and member of Council
John Martin (meteorologist) (1789–1869), English physician and meteorologist
John Martin (minister) (1741–1820), English Particular Baptist minister
John Martin (priest) (1797–1878), Anglican priest in Ireland
John Martin (headmaster) (1814–1876), educator in Adelaide, South Australia
John Martin (oceanographer) (1935–1993), American scientist
John Bartlow Martin (1915–1987), American author and ambassador
John F. Martin, Deputy Supreme Knight of the Knights of Columbus, 1927–1933
John Jeffries Martin, American academic and author
John Joseph Martin (1922–1997), NASA engineer and administrator
John Levi Martin (born 1964), American sociologist
John William Martin (1860–1956), British Fabian and academic in the United States
John Martin, American member of the Committee of Fifty
John Martin, captain of Bartholomew Gosnold's ship when he found Martha's Vineyard
John Martin & Co., known as "John Martin's" or "Johnnies" (1866–1998), department store in Adelaide, South Australia
John Martin Brewery, Belgian brewery founded in 1909
John Martin Scripps, a British-Singaporean killer, later executed

See also
J. Thomas Marten (born 1951), United States federal judge
Jack Martin (disambiguation)
John B. Martin (disambiguation)
John D. Martin (disambiguation)
John Martyn (disambiguation)
Jonathan Martin (disambiguation)

Martin, John